Joasaphus Skripitsyn (or Ioasaph or Joasaph; ? – 1555 or 1556) was the Metropolitan of Moscow and all Rus' from  1539 to 1542. He was the ninth Metropolitan in Moscow to be appointed without the approval of the Ecumenical Patriarch of Constantinople as had been the norm.

Joasaph is known to have authored a number of theological works. Joasaphus was first a monk and then hegumen at the Trinity-St. Sergius Lavra (since 1529). He enjoyed the favor of Grand Prince Vasili III. After Metropolitan Daniel had been deposed at the church sobor of 1539, Joasaph was elected Metropolitan of Moscow just three days later (5 February 1539). He is known to have opposed the supporters of the Josephites or "Non-possessors" and favored the opponents of monastic landownership. Joasaph was the one to solicit young Ivan IV's forgiveness for the disgraced Belskys and prince Vladimir of Staritsa and render support for Maximus the Greek. 

During the regency of Grand Duchess Elena Glinskaya, in the first five years of the reign of Ivan IV (1533–1538), Joasaph managed to keep his influence at the royal court, but in 1542, Joasaph fell into disgrace and was exiled to the Kirillo-Belozersky Monastery and then transferred to the Trinity-St. Sergius Lavra in 1547, where he would remain until his death on 27 July 1555.

References

Metropolitans of Kiev and all Rus' (Patriarchate of Moscow)
1550s deaths
Year of birth unknown